Bad Branch Falls is a waterfall located in Rabun County, in the U.S State of Georgia. It is near Lake Rabun and Lake Seed.

Waterfalls of Georgia (U.S. state)
Waterfalls of Rabun County, Georgia